The Bến Tre River is a river of Vietnam. It flows for 30 kilometres through Bến Tre Province.

References

Rivers of Bến Tre province
Rivers of Vietnam